Tattykeeran is a townland of 459 acres in County Fermanagh, Northern Ireland. It is situated in the civil parish of Aghavea and the historic barony of Magherastephana.

See also
List of townlands in County Fermanagh

References

Townlands of County Fermanagh
Civil parish of Aghavea